Chontla is a municipality in Veracruz, Mexico. It is located in the northern part of the state, about 220 km from state capital Xalapa. It has a surface of 361.09 km2.

Geography

Borders
Chontla is delimited to the west by Tantoyuca, to the south by Ixcatepec and Tepetzintla, and to the east by Citlaltépetl and Ozuluama.

Settlements

Products
It produces principally maize, beans and chili peppers.

Events
In November the celebration in honor of Santa Catarina takes place .

Weather
The weather in Chontla is warm all year with rains in summer.

References

External links 

  Official website

Municipalities of Veracruz